Carlo Cane (1618–1688) was an Italian painter of the Baroque period.

Biography
He was born at Gallarate, Province of Varese. He was instructed by Melchiore Gilardini. He copied the works of Morazzone with success, and became a historical painter, particularly in fresco. He painted in fresco a St. Ambrose and St. Hugo in the Certosa at Padua. He also painted landscapes and animals. He died at Milan. There is a second Carlo Cane of Trino, in his History of Trino as having painted in 1600 two altar-pieces for the Benedictine abbey of Locedia.

References

1618 births
1688 deaths
People from Gallarate
17th-century Italian painters
Italian male painters
Italian Baroque painters
Painters from Milan